The 1986 United States Senate election in Colorado was held on November 4, 1986. Incumbent Democratic U.S. Senator Gary Hart decided to retire instead of seeking a third term. Democratic nominee Tim Wirth won the open seat.

General election

Candidates 

 Michael Martin Bush (Independent)
 Michael R. Chamberlain (Socialist Workers)
 Calvin G. Dodge (Prohibition)
 Ken Kramer, U.S. Representative from Colorado Springs (Republican)
 Henry John Olshaw (American Independent)

 Tim Wirth, U.S. Representative from Boulder (Democratic)

Results

See also 
 1986 United States Senate elections

References 

Colorado
1986
1986 Colorado elections